Real Sociedad de Fútbol "B" (also known as Sanse) is a Spanish football team based in San Sebastián, in the autonomous community of Basque Country. Founded in 1955, it is the reserve team of Real Sociedad and plays in Primera Federación – Group 2, holding home games at Campo José Luis Orbegozo holding 2,500 spectators of the Zubieta Facilities.

Unlike in nations such as England, reserve teams in Spain play in the same football pyramid as their senior team rather than a separate league. However, reserve teams cannot play in the same division as their senior team. Therefore, the team is ineligible for promotion to La Liga, the division in which the main side plays. Reserve teams are also no longer permitted to enter the Copa del Rey.

History
The team's origin dates from 1952 when the Real Sociedad youth team were runners-up in the Copa del Rey Juvenil and the club's board sought to bridge the gap between the talented teenagers and the senior team: the concept of Real Sociedad de Fútbol Junior was introduced, but economic problems delayed its first official match until 1955, immediately after the youth team won the Copa Juvenil. After quickly gaining promotion to the third tier to become part of the national football pyramid, a name change was required to differentiate them from the senior team, and San Sebastián Club de Fútbol was chosen. They first reached the second division in 1959–60, and achieved a best ever classification in the category after finishing fifth two years later; however, as the main squad was relegated from La Liga, San Sebastián was ineligible for promotion, being relegated instead.

In 1980, Sanse was promoted to the newly created Segunda División B, remaining in that category for 17 consecutive seasons. Afterwards they fluctuated between the third and fourth tiers, reaching the promotion playoffs of the former in 1991 and 2006 but subsequently falling short. In 1992, a change in rules forced the team to change its name, and it was renamed Real Sociedad de Fútbol B. Liga de Fútbol Profesional's rules prohibit B clubs from having different names from their parent club, the exceptions being Real Madrid Castilla and Sevilla Atlético. Upon celebrating its 50-year anniversary in 2007, the team had used 486 players, preparing dozens to represent the first team including the vast majority of the squad that won the Spanish championship twice in succession (1980–81 and  1981–82).

A change in the club structure from 2016 meant that most Sanse players would be promoted from a new subsidiary, Real Sociedad C (previously known as Berio), who would play in Tercera División with under-20 graduates of the club's youth system. The Real Sociedad C team must play at least one division below Real Sociedad B.

In the 2017–18 season, the team finished third in Group 2. In 2020–21, Sanse won their group and gained promotion to the second division 59 years since their last appearance, after defeating Algeciras in the promotion play-off finals. On 22 May 2022, Sanse was relegated back to the third tier after only one season in second tier.

Club names
Real Sociedad de Fútbol Junior – (1955–57)San Sebastián Club de Fútbol – (1957–91)Real Sociedad de Fútbol "B" – (1991–92)Real Sociedad de Fútbol, S.A.D. "B" – (1992–)

Season to season
As a reserve team of Real Sociedad

Merged with Real Sociedad

3 seasons in Segunda División
1 season in Primera Federación
35 seasons in Segunda División B
27 seasons in Tercera División

Current squad
.

Reserve team

Out on loan

Current technical staff

Former players

  Victor Fuchs

Honours
Segunda División B: 
Winners: 2020–21
Tercera División: 
Winners: 1959–60
Winners: 1979–80, 1998–99, 1999–2000, 2009–10

Notes

Stadium
Real Sociedad B hold home games at Instalaciones de Zubieta, which holds 2,500 spectators.

Players of both the first and the second teams train in these facilities, with Sanse's players being nicknamed "Potrillos" ("Colts") as the grounds are located near the city's horse racetrack.

Former coaches

Imanol Alguacil
Periko Alonso
José Ramón Eizmendi

Imanol Idiakez
Meho Kodro
Asier Santana

See also
 :Category:Real Sociedad B footballers
 Real Sociedad
 Real Sociedad C
 Real Sociedad cantera – youth section

References

External links
 
Futbolme team profile 
La Preferente team profile 

Real Sociedad
Football clubs in the Basque Country (autonomous community)
Spanish reserve football teams
Association football clubs established in 1955
1955 establishments in Spain
Sports teams in San Sebastián
Segunda División clubs
Primera Federación clubs